Svetlana Lvovna Geiman (born 29 April 1977), known professionally as Linda, is a Russian singer and songwriter. Her style incorporates trip hop, electronic, and ethnic music. Since January 2012, she has been married to Greek composer Stefanos Korkolis.

Discography

Studio albums

Remix albums

Compilation albums

Singles

References

External links
First non-official website 
Second non-official website 
Linda's translations

1977 births
Kazakhstani emigrants to Russia
Living people
Musicians from Moscow
People from Kentau
Russian women singer-songwriters
Russian folk singers
Russian Jews
Russian pop singers
Russian rock singers
Russian folk musicians
Universal Music Group artists
21st-century Russian women singers
21st-century Russian singers
Jewish women singers
Jewish rock musicians
20th-century Russian Jews